Lake Hopatcong is a commuter railroad station for New Jersey Transit. The station, located in the community of Landing in Roxbury Township, Morris County, New Jersey, United States, serves trains for the Montclair-Boonton Line and Morristown Line at peak hours and on holiday weekends. Service from Lake Hopatcong provides to/from Hackettstown to New York Penn Station and Hoboken Terminal. The stop is located on the tracks below Landing Road (Morris County Route 631) next to the eponymous Lake Hopatcong. The station consists of one active and one abandoned side platform, along with a shelter on the active platform. There is no accessibility for handicapped persons under the Americans with Disabilities Act of 1990.

Service through the Landing area began on January 16, 1854, for the Morris and Essex Railroad, but there was no stop at the shore of Lake Hopatcong.  People who wanted to visit the lake had to get off at nearby Drakesville station and traverse from there to the lake. In 1882, after the Central Railroad of New Jersey built the Wharton and Northern Railroad to Charlotteburgh, there was added incentive to bring a station to the Lake Hopatcong area. The Delaware, Lackawanna and Western Railroad, which took over the Morris and Essex tracks, established a stop in Landing in 1882. In 1910, service began by the Morris County Traction Company, an electric trolley railroad.

The Lackawanna Railroad announced on July 15, 1910, that a new station would be built at Lake Hopatcong, just east of the nearby county bridge. The new station opened on May 28, 1911, a new all-concrete structure with two elevators and a complete walkway on the south side of the Morris Canal. Service on the Lackawanna Cut-Off, a new mainline just west at Port Morris, opened on December 24, 1911. The concrete overpass was demolished in 1982, after being condemned in 1978. The station depot on Landing Road continues to stand.

History

1882 DL&W station

The railroad tracks through Landing were first laid in 1854 by the Morris and Essex Railroad, which was extending its line from Newark westward to Hackettstown. The right-of-way parallelled the three-decade-old Morris Canal past Lake Hopatcong, the canal's leading source of water. But Landing itself, one of several hamlets that arose to serve the canal's boat crews and mule teams, held no particular promise as a revenue stop, and so no station was built there for about 30 years.

That began to change in 1882, when the Central Railroad of New Jersey opened a station further up the lake and proved that there was money in direct passenger service to a promising vacation spot. Around 1886, the first station in Landing was built by the Delaware, Lackawanna and Western Railroad, a CNJ rival that had taken over the M&E in 1868. The small depot and platforms were sandwiched between the tracks and the canal, requiring most passengers to enter and depart via the steel, cable-stayed Landing Road Bridge. This arrangement, however, did allow passengers to move easily between trains and the steamboats that would take them to lakeshore destinations. A steamboat company, the Black Line, was founded that same year by "the same financial syndicate that owned the Lackawanna Railway and the Morris Canal."

The station also prompted one of several manmade reshapings of Lake Hopatcong. In 1891, when the new White Line steamboat company failed to secure the right to ply the canal, it dredged the swampy, non-navigable southern tip to create Landing Channel and erect a pier a block or so away from the tracks.

1911 DL&W station
 
By 1906 or so, several factors led the DL&W to plan a new station. First, the area's summer tourist trade was growing as visitors flocked to the lake. Second, the railroad was preparing to begin one of the most ambitious mainline construction projects in the world: the Lackawanna Cut-Off. This new,  route through the hills of northern New Jersey, designed to slice an hour off journeys to Scranton and points west and north, would begin at Port Morris Junction, less than a mile to the west.

So in 1910, as work proceeded on the Cut-Off, the DL&W began building a new station at Landing. The main building was of native rough stone with cement trimming and a green glazed tile roof. Its oak interior had a ticket office, waiting room and baggage room. Because this depot sat up a hill on Landing Road, perhaps  higher than the tracks, the station complex also included long stairs down to the Hoboken-bound platform and elevated walkways with large elevators to transport passengers and baggage. The Morris County Traction Company trolley line took passengers onward to Bertrand Island.

The station itself cost $28,500 (equal to $ today)  and the railroad was said to have spent $75,000 (equal to $ today) to build the accompanying structures. The new station opened on May 28, 1911, six months before the first trains rolled on the Cut-Off.

In 1912, the DL&W built a similar station at Mountain Lakes, New Jersey.

The elevated walkways rendered the old bridge completely redundant (its duties for vehicular traffic had already been assumed by a parallel bridge of stone built in 1907), and it was eventually demolished.

In the 1920s, the DL&W's station became the preeminent rail link to Lake Hopatcong, surpassing the CNJ's station at Nolan's Point. But change was afoot: In 1924, the canal was closed, its cargo business long since gone to railroads, and the steamboat dock removed. Within five years, much of the canal was filled with new structures.

During its operation by the DL&W and its successor, the Erie Lackawanna, the Lake Hopatcong station provided transfers between trains using the Cut-Off and those headed to Phillipsburg, New Jersey, and Portland, Pennsylvania, via the Old Main line. In 1960, the DL&W merged with the Erie Railroad and the Lake Hopatcong station and tracks passed to the new Erie Lackawanna.

In 1976, the station and tracks passed to Conrail, which soon sold off the stone depot. The overpass was declared unsafe in 1978, the station was declared a safety hazard by Morris County. Plans were made to demolished the aging overhead structure, which would involve new platforms being constructed. The demolition of the structure began in May 1982.

Post-railroad use of the 1911 depot
The stone station building, whose address became 125 Landing Road, served as a real estate office and a hardware store. Next, it was purchased by an interior design business whose proprietors restored the marble floor and other original features. In 2012, the building was occupied by a role-playing games store.

On November 6, 2014, the building was purchased by the Lake Hopatcong Foundation, which aimed to use part of the structure as office and meeting space, and open the rest to the public as an environmental and cultural center.

In 2016, the foundation commissioned a new roof of glazed clay tiles from Lodowici Roof Tiles, the New Lexington, Ohio, company that supplied the building's original tiles in 1911. The preparation for the new roof revealed deterioration in the structure's stone parapets. A grant from the Morris County Historic Preservation Trust funded the $215,000 job. That year, the building was added to the National Register of Historic Places and New Jersey's similar state register.

By 2021, the foundation's effort to restore and preserve the building had received a total of $1,129,143 from the Morris County Historic Preservation Trust Fund and two grants, or $150,000 and $254,879, from the New Jersey Historic Trust. That year, the foundation's work on the building was recognized in 2021 with an award from Preservation New Jersey, a non-profit historic preservation organization.

Station layout
Today, the New Jersey Transit station consists of little more than two low-level asphalt side platforms, a small shelter on the westbound side, and a parking lot. A shelter on the eastbound platform was demolished sometime after 2005.

Future service

Since 2008, New Jersey Transit has relaid tracks and undertaken other preparations to restore service to a  segment of the Lackawanna Cut-Off route between Port Morris Junction and a planned station at Andover in Sussex County.  It plans to launch service on the segment in 2025. A further extension to Scranton has also been proposed. Sen. Charles Schumer (D-NY) has proposed extending service to Binghamton, New York.

Notes

References

External links 

 Photo, ca. 1905, of the rail station and canal
 Map of the station area, ca. 1925-1942
  Erie-Lackawanna Railfan Site
 Station from Landing Road from Google Maps Street View

Railway stations in Morris County, New Jersey
NJ Transit Rail Operations stations
Railway stations in the United States opened in 1882
Roxbury Township, New Jersey
Former Delaware, Lackawanna and Western Railroad stations
Lackawanna Cut-Off
1882 establishments in New Jersey
Historic district contributing properties in Morris County, New Jersey
New Jersey Register of Historic Places